Michael John McCool (15 September 1951 – 23 June 2020) was a New Zealand rugby union player. A lock, McCool attended Kereru School, and then St. Patrick's College, Silverstream, where he was a member of the 1st XV in 1968.  

He represented Hawke's Bay and Wairarapa Bush at a provincial level, and was a member of the New Zealand national side, the All Blacks, in 1979. He played two matches for the All Blacks, including one test match against Australia.

McCool died while working on his family lifestyle property in the Auckland region on 23 June 2020, survived by his wife, Deb, and four of their five children.

References

1951 births
2020 deaths
Rugby union players from Hastings, New Zealand
People educated at St. Patrick's College, Silverstream
New Zealand rugby union players
New Zealand international rugby union players
Hawke's Bay rugby union players
Rugby union locks
Wairarapa Bush rugby union players